Mortimer Lichtenauer (May 11, 1876 – May 30, 1966) was an American painter. His work was part of the painting event in the art competition at the 1932 Summer Olympics.

Biography
Joseph Mortimer Lichtenauer, portrait painter, muralist , sculptor and art collector, was born in New York City on May 11, 1876  from Joseph Mortimer  Lichtenauer, an investiment advisor, and Rebecca Deutsch. He studied at the Art Students League with Henry Siddons Mowbray before moving to Paris where he entered the Académie Julian. There he studied under Luc-Olivier Merson,  Jean-Joseph Benjamin-Constant and Jean-Paul Laurens and met Cadwallader Washburn,  Louis Vaillant, and Carolus-Duran. He usually  frequented the American club with  Henry Ossawa Tanner of Pennsylvania and joined the American Art Association in 1898. In the following years he  lived in New York  married Giulia de Ghira and, after her death, he remarried with Irma Lena Kaufman on November 24, 1909 living in New York, Central Park Studios 15 West 67 street and then 154 West 55th Street.   He travelled a great deal   living also in Italy and Florence in particular  where he died on march, 30th, 1966. His remains were cremated and his ashes deposited in the "American Church" St. James Episcopal Church, Via Bernardo Rucellai 13, Florence and a cenotaph is present at  Lichtenauer family plot at Mount Pleasant Cemetery Hawthorne. A muralist as well, Lichtenauer painted the ceiling of the Shubert Theater in New York City and created murals for the Adelphi Theatre (New York City), cycle dismembered in 1970, and Washington Irving High School. He also created a series of panels for the Washington Bi-Centennial. Lichtenauer was also a member of the Salmagundi Club and the American Federation of the Arts. As art collector he made a gift to Metropolitan Museum of Art of some drawings by Cristoforo Roncalli and Giuseppe Cesari. In his career he won many medals, among which we can remember the bronze medal for a sketch for a mural painting illustrating the “ Glorification of the City of New York" and an other bronze medal in 1937 for the "Javanese".  His works may be found in the Smithsonian American Art Museum, Brooklyn Museum and the Metropolitan Museum of Art.

Artwork
He was a pupil of  academic painters and  loving  classic art lived for many years in  Italy. These facts  influenced  no doubt  his tastes and  style. His works are remarkable for the way in which every particular is represented. Idyllic paintings of classicized female figures  reminiscent of greek beauty but  with the dynamism and elegance of symbolist and art nouveau painting.  If his subjects are classic it is not so with his brushstroke which is fresh and fast with intense and bright colors. In some cases with a dense and pasty draft and with the use of the palette knife and an almost impressionist technique where color and light give life to the subjects represented. His best known work is the decoration of the Shubert theater: a series of painted panels which adorn boxes, the area above proscenium arch and the ceiling. The subjects represented are figures  with masks  of Minoan and renaissance inspiration and semi-nude females of allegorical meaning such as Music and Drama.

Works
 Portrait of General John Julius Stahel, oil on canvas, 1917, Smithsonian American Art Museum
 Two Nudes, Graphite and pastel on paper, Brooklyn Museum. 
 Studies of female figures, crayon on paper, signed and dated 1926, Metropolitan Museum of Art.
 Mother and child, Oil on canvas. Signed and dated 1919. 
 Portrait of a seated female figure in Japanese dress, oil on canvas, about 1920. 
 And They Shall Beat Their Swords into Plow Shares, Signed, mixed media on board. 
 Portrait of Mrs. Guild, oil on panel. 
 Bronze, with foundry mark "OFIR/Gorham Co. Foundries, signed. 
 Still life with figurines, Oil on canvas, 1965. 
 "Javanesque (Javanese)" Pastel and graphite on brown paper, signed and dated 1937.

References

External links
 

1876 births
1966 deaths
20th-century American painters
American male painters
Olympic competitors in art competitions
People from New York City
American muralists
20th-century American male artists